Sarah Makem (18 October 1900 – 20 April 1983) a native of Keady, County Armagh, Northern Ireland, was a traditional Irish singer.  She was the wife of fiddler Peter Makem, mother of musicians Tommy Makem and Jack Makem, and grandmother of musicians Tom Sweeney, Jimmy Sweeney (of Northern Irish Canadian group Barley Bree),  Shane Makem, Conor Makem and Rory Makem. Sarah Makem and her cousin, Annie Jane Kelly, were members of the Singing Greenes of Keady.

In the 1950s, song collectors from the United States toured Ireland recording its musical heritage. Makem was visited and recorded by, among others, Diane Guggenheim Hamilton, Jean Ritchie, Peter Kennedy and Sean O'Boyle. Her rendition of "As I Roved Out" opened the BBC Radio folk music programme of the same name in the 1950s.

Background 
Sarah Makem lived in Keady her whole life. Living in the border region of Ulster and in a market town, she was influenced by Irish, Scottish, and English traditions. Makem learned songs from her mother while she was doing household chores such as cooking. Makem would often pick up these songs while sitting with her mother after just one repetition. Makem also learned some of her repertoire from songs the children would sing in school.

Sarah left school early to work as a factory weaver as many of the girls did in her town. She would work from 7 am to 6:30 pm then come home to have sessions with many of the other musicians living in the same area. Makem married Peter Makem in 1919.

Musical career 
Sarah Makem would not consider herself a musician; however, she had an extensive musical career. She was a ballad singer who had over five hundred songs in memory. These songs she describes as life stories of murder and love and emigration songs. Makem recorded many of her songs, mostly for collection purposes. One of those songs, "As I Roved Out" was used to open a BBC radio program featuring Irish folk music named after Makem's ballad. Makem did not intend to use this recording as such, and was very embarrassed to know her voice would be heard everyday across Ireland.

Songs

Note:  Footnotes take you to lyrics, but not necessarily to the recordings of Sarah Makem, as many of the songs are traditional.

Makem collected, performed and/or composed, and handed down hundreds of songs including:
"As I Roved Out"
"Barbara Allen"
"Barney Mavourneen"
"Blow Ye Winds"
"The Butcher Boy"
"Caroline and her Young Sailor Bold"
"The Cobbler"
"The Cot in the Corner"
"Derry Gaol"
"Dobbin's Flowery Vale" 
"The Factory Girl"
"Farewell My Love, Remember Me"
"I Courted a Wee Girl"
"John Mitchel"
"The Jolly Thresher"
"Little Beggarman"
"Magpie's Nest"
"A Man in Love He Feels No Cold"
"Mary of Kilmore"
"May Morning Dew"
"Month of January" ("The Forsaken Mother & Child")
"On the Banks of Red Roses"
"Our Ship She's Ready to Bear Away"
"Robert Burns and his Highland Mary"
"A Servant Maid in her Father's Garden"
"Willie Reilly"
"The Wind That Shakes the Barley"

Recordings
Sarah Makem has been recorded extensively, and is included on the following recordings:
Ulster Ballad Singer (1967) - Sarah Makem
Field Trip (1954) - Jean Ritchie
The Lark in the Morning - Liam Clancy and others (1956)
Best of the Clancy Brothers (1994) - The Clancy Brothers
Sea Songs & Shanties (1994) - Various Artists
Traditional Songs of Ireland (1995) - Various Artists
Ancient Celtic Roots (1996) - Various Artists
Celtic Mouth Music (1997) - Various Artists
Irish Voices: The Best in Traditional Singing (1997) - Various Artists
Celtic Reflections (1998) - Various Artists
Celtic Voices (1999) - Various Artists
Who's That at My Bedroom Window (1999) - Various Artists
The Voice of the People, Vol.  6: Come Let Us Buy the License (1999) - Various Artists  
The Voice of the People Vol.  8: A Story I’m Just About to Tell (1999) - Various Artists
The Voice of the People Vol. 17: It Fell on a Day a Bonny Summer Day (1999) - Various Artists
The Voice of the People:  A Selection (2000) - Various Artists
The Voice of the People: Sarah Makem: The Heart Is True (2012) - Sarah Makem

In 2009 The Banks of Red Roses from Sarah Makem : Ulster Ballad Singer was included in Topic Records 70 year anniversary boxed set Three Score and Ten as track three of the third CD.

References

External links
 Sarah Makem at SmithsonianGlobalSound.org
 The Makem and Spain Brothers Official Web Page
 Other Irish source singers may be found at Folkopedia
 Folktrax.org
 Mudcat.org

1900 births
1983 deaths
20th-century women singers from Northern Ireland
Folk singers from Northern Ireland
Musicians from County Armagh
People from Keady